The economy of Réunion has traditionally been based on agriculture. Sugarcane has been the primary crop for more than a century, and in some years it accounts for 85% of exports. The government has been pushing the development of a tourist industry to relieve high unemployment, which amounts to more than 40% of the labour force.

The gap in Réunion between the well-off and the poor is large and accounts for the persistent social tensions. The outbreak of severe rioting in February 1991 illustrated the seriousness of socio-economic tensions. However, this gap has been closing in the last 15 years.

In 2007 the GDP per capita of Réunion at nominal exchange rates, not at PPP, was €17,146 (US$23,501). However, while this is exceptionally high compared with its neighbours in Madagascar and the African continent, it is only 57% of the 30,140 euros per capita GDP of metropolitan France in 2007. The total GDP of the island was US$18.8 billion in 2007.

Other export products 
 Essential oil (mainly vetyver and rose scent geranium)
 Bourbon vanilla
 Fish & seafood, mainly tuna, swordfish and Patagonian toothfish

Statistics 
Currency: 1 euro (sign: €; code: EUR) = 100 Cent
Exchange rates: See: Euro exchange rate
Fiscal year: calendar year

See also 

 Economy of France in: French Guiana, French Polynesia, Guadeloupe, Martinique, Mayotte, New Caledonia, Réunion, Saint Barthélemy, Saint Martin, Saint Pierre and Miquelon, Wallis and Futuna
 Taxation in France
 Economic history of France
 Poverty in France

Notes